East is East is a 1990 novel by American author T. Coraghessan Boyle.

Book information
East is East by T. C. Boyle
 Hardcover:  (First edition, September 1, 1990) published by Viking Press
 Paperback:  (August 1, 1991) published by Penguin Books

External links
 T.C. Boyle official web site

East is East
Novels by T. C. Boyle
Roman à clef novels
Viking Press books